Sandrine Dixson-Declève is an international climate change, sustainable development, sustainable finance and complex systems thought leader. She is currently the Co-president of the Club of Rome, together with Mamphela Ramphele, the first women to lead the organization in its history.

Dixson-Declève is a TED Countdown and TedX speaker and author of numerous publications and book chapters including the upcoming book Earth for all – A survival guide to humanity.

She divides her time between lecturing, facilitating difficult conversations and advising policy and business leaders across the globe. Dixson-Declève has been recognised by GreenBiz as one of the 30 most influential women across the globe driving change in the low-carbon economy and promoting green business.

Author, speaker and facilitator of difficult conversations

Policy-oriented publications for humanity’s wicked problems 
Dixson-Declѐve was a driving force behind both the Planetary Emergency Plan 1:0 and 2:0. These reports, first published in 2018 provide a set of key policy levers to address the cross-cutting challenges of climate change, biodiversity loss and human health and wellbeing. The Plans have since been infused into international discussions on climate, biodiversity, sustainable development and global risks.

She has contributed to numerous reports providing policy recommendations on major global issues including A System Change Compass: Implementing the European Green Deal in a time of recovery, 21st Century Wellbeing Economics: The Road to Recovery, Renewal & Resilience and Anchoring Transformation: Policy Anchors for Ensuring a new European Social-Economic Paradigm.

TED Countdown and TedX: The Sustainable Future series 
Dixson-Declѐve was a speaker in the TED Countdown and TEDX: The Sustainable Future series. In conversation with TED global curator Bruno Giussani, she presented “5 keys to shifting to a well-being economy - and the cost of inaction”, outlining what has been learned since the first "Limits to Growth" report warned of the consequences of unlimited economic growth and presenting Earth4All: an international initiative identifying the transformations needed to move to wellbeing economies, accelerate systems-change, and achieve greater wellbeing for all within planetary boundaries.

DLD Conference 2022 
At the DLD Conference 2022 she reflected on the prescience of the Club of Rome’s landmark report The Limits to Growth, fifty years after its publication. She outlined the need for transformational economics and systems change as humanity reaches environmental and social tipping points.

UN COP26 World Leaders Summit 
A respected expert facilitator, Dixson-Declѐve chaired the UN COP26 World Leaders Summit ‘Action on Forests & Land Use’ event which brought together an unprecedented alliance of governments, companies, financial actors, and non-state leaders to raise ambition on forests and land-use. Over 100 leaders pledged to end deforestation at this session.

Earth4All 
Dixson-Declѐve co-authored the upcoming book "Earth for All – A Survival Guide for Humanity"; which brings together the findings of leading economists and scientists from around the world over a two year period. As part of the Earth4All initiative, the 21st Century Transformational Economics Commission, co-led by Dixson-Declѐve and Anders Wijkman, guided state-of-the-art computer modeling, to explore policies likely to deliver the most good for the majority of people. The book identifies five turnarounds that will achieve prosperity for all within planetary limits in a single generation.

Quel Monde Pour Demain 
Dixson-Declѐve recently released a joint intergenerational book on the future, climate change and the risks that weigh on humanity:“Quel Monde Pour Demain”, Éditions Luc Pire.

Education and career 
She graduated from University of California, Davis with a Bachelor's degree in International Relations and French. She also holds a Master's degree in Environmental Sciences from the University of Brussels.

She has spent her career bringing together business leaders, policy makers, academia and NGOs to unpack complex challenges.

The Club of Rome 
In 2018 Dixson-Declѐve and Mamphela Ramphele were appointed as Co-presidents of the Club of Rome, the first women to lead the organization in its history. They were both re-elected for a second three-year term in 2021.

Dixson-Declѐve was Chief Partnership Officer for the UN Agency Sustainable Energy for All and prior to that was Director of the Prince of Wales’s Corporate Leaders Group and the EU office of the Cambridge Institute for Sustainability Leadership (2009-2016). During this period she was also appointed as Executive Director of the Green Growth Platform bringing together EU Ministers and CEOs. She was Executive Director of Hart Energy Consulting’s International Sustainable Energy Exchange (ISEE).

Dixson-Declѐve has worked with chemical and petro-chemical producers and the Finnish Environment Institute (FEI) on the European Commission’s MTBE Risk Assessment

Recognitions and advisory positions 
Dixson-Declève currently Chairs the European Commission, Expert Group on Economic and Societal Impact of Research & Innovation (ESIR) and sits on several boards and advisory boards including Climate KIC, laudes Foundation, EDP, BMW, UCB and is a Senior Associate and faculty member of the Cambridge Institute for Sustainability Leadership (CISL).  In addition, she is an Ambassador, for the Energy Transition Commission (ETC) and the Well Being Alliance (WeAll) and a Fellow of the World Academy of Science & Art. In 2017 Sandrine co-founded the Women Enablers Change Agent Network (WECAN).

Over her career, she has advised HRH The Prince of Wales, members of the European Parliament, European Commission presidents, governments around the world, international organizations (OPEC, ADB, OECD, UNEP, USAID, UNFCCC, IEA) and business leaders of large international, European and African companies. She advised the European Commission in its major stakeholder process on European Chemical policy and was a member of The Guardian’s Sustainable Business Advisory Board.

Until recently, Dixson-Declève was on the European Commissions Sustainable Finance Platform and Sustainable Finance Taxonomy Expert Group, Assembly Member, Climate Mitigation & Adaptation Mission (European Commission, DGR&I) and chaired the UCL Bartlett School of Environment Energy & Resources Advisory Board.

Personal 
Dixson-Declève is based in Belgium, is married to Jeremy Evans Dixson and has two daughters, Zoe and Tessa Dixson.

She is fluent in French and English and has a basic knowledge of Spanish.

References 

Futurologists
Globalism
Living people
Year of birth missing (living people)
University of California, Davis alumni